Krek may refer to:
 Krek (film), a 1968 animated film
 Krek (album), a 2005 album by Khold
 Janez Evangelist Krek (1865–1917), Slovenian politician, priest, journalist, and author
 Miha Krek (1897–1969), Slovenian lawyer and politician
 Uroš Krek (1922–2008), Slovenian composer